North Quincy may refer to one of the following places:

North Quincy (Quincy, Massachusetts) a neighborhood in Quincy, Massachusetts.
North Quincy station a station on the Red line subway
North Quincy High School
North Quincy, Illinois an unincorporated community located north of Quincy, Illinois